Gamma-aminobutyric acid receptor subunit beta-3 is a protein that in humans is encoded by the GABRB3 gene. It is located within the 15q12 region in the human genome and spans 250kb. This gene includes 10 exons within its coding region. Due to alternative splicing, the gene codes for many protein isoforms, all being subunits in the GABAA receptor, a ligand-gated ion channel. The beta-3 subunit is expressed at different levels within the cerebral cortex, hippocampus, cerebellum, thalamus, olivary body and piriform cortex of the brain at different points of development and maturity. GABRB3 deficiencies are implicated in many human neurodevelopmental disorders and syndromes such as Angelman syndrome, Prader-Willi syndrome, nonsyndromic orofacial clefts, epilepsy and autism. The effects of methaqualone and etomidate are mediated through GABBR3 positive allosteric modulation.

Gene 
The GABRB3 gene is located on the long arm of chromosome 15, within the q12 region in the human genome. It is located in a gene cluster, with two other genes, GABRG3 and GABRA5. GABRB3 was the first gene to be mapped to this particular region. It spans approximately 250kb and includes 10 exons within its coding region, as well as two additional alternative first exons that encode for signaling peptides. Alternatively spliced transcript variants encoding isoforms with distinct signal peptides have been described. This gene is located within an imprinting region that spans the 15q11-13 region. Its sequence is considerably longer than the two other genes found within its gene cluster due to a large 150kb intron it carries. A pattern is observed in GABRB3 gene replication, in humans the maternal allele is replicated later than the paternal allele. The reasoning and implications of this pattern are unknown.

When comparing the human beta-3 subunit's genetic sequence with other vertebrate beta-3 subunit sequences, there is a high level of genetic conservation. In mice the Gabrb3 gene is located on chromosome 7 of its genome in a similar gene cluster style with some of the other subunits of the GABAA receptor.

Function 
GABRB3 encodes a member of the ligand-gated ion channel family. The encoded protein is one of at least 13 distinct subunits of a multisubunit chloride channel that serves as the receptor for gamma-aminobutyric acid, the major inhibitory neurotransmitter of the nervous system. The two other genes in the gene cluster both encode for related subunits of the family. During development, when the GABRB3 subunit functions optimally, its role in the GABAA receptor allows for proliferation, migration, and differentiation of precursor cells that lead to the proper development of the brain. GABAA receptor function is inhibited by zinc ions. The ions bind allosterically to the receptor, a mechanism that is critically dependent on the receptor subunit composition.

De novo heterozygous missense mutations within a highly conserved region of the GABRB3 gene can decrease the peak current amplitudes of neurons or alter the kinetic properties of the channel. This results in the loss of the inhibitory properties of the receptor.

The beta-3 subunit has very similar function to the human version of the subunit.

Structure
The crystal structure of a human β3 homopentamer was published in 2014. The study of the crystal structure of the human β3 homopentamer revealed unique qualities that are only observed in eukaryotic cysteine-loop receptors. The characterization of the GABAA receptor and subunits helps with the mechanistic determination of mutations within the subunits and what direct effect the mutations may have on the protein and its interactions.

Expression 
The expression of GABRB3 is not constant among all cells or at all stages of development. The distribution of expression of the GABAA receptor subunits (GABRB3 included) during development indicates that GABA may function as a neurotrophic factor, impacting neural differentiation, growth, and circuit organization. The expression of the beta-3 subunit reaches peak at different times in different locations of the brain, during development. The highest expression of Gabrb3 in mice, within the cerebral cortex and hippocampus are reached prenatally, while they are reached postnatally in the cerebellar cortex. After the highest peak of expression, Gabrb3 expression is down-regulated substantially in the thalamus and inferior olivary body of the mouse. By adulthood, the level of expression in the cerebral cortex and hippocampus drops below developmental expression levels, but the expression in the cerebellum does not change postnatally. The highest levels of Gabrb3 expression in the mature mouse brain occur in the Purkinje and granule cells of the cerebellum, the hippocampus, and the piriform cortex.

In humans, the beta-3 subunit, as well as the subunits of its two neighbouring genes (GABRG3 and GABRA5), are bi-allelically expressed within the cerebral cortex, indicating that the gene is not subjected to imprinting within those cells.

Imprinting Patterns 
Due to the location of GABRB3 in the 15q11-13 imprinting region found in humans, this gene is subject to imprinting depending on the location and the cells developmental state. Imprinting is not present in the mouse brain, having an equal expression from maternal and paternal alleles.

Regulation 
Phosphorylation of the GABAA by cAMP-dependent protein kinase (PKA) has a regulatory effect dependent on the beta subunit involved. The mechanism by which the kinase is targeted towards the bata-3 subunit is unknown. AKAP79/150 binds directly to the GABRB3 subunit, which is critical for its own phosphorylation, mediated by PKA.

Gabrb3 shows significantly reduced expression postnatally, when mice are deficient in MECP2. When the MECP2 gene is knocked out, the expression of Gabrb3 is reduced, suggesting a relationship of positive regulation between the two genes.

Clinical significance
Mutations in this gene may be associated with the pathogenesis of Angelman syndrome, nonsyndromic orofacial clefts, epilepsy and autism. The GABRB3 gene has been associated with savant skills accompanying such disorders.

In mice, the knockout mutation of Gabrb3 causes severe neonatal mortality with the cleft palate phenotype present, the survivors experiencing hyperactivity, lack of coordination and suffering with epileptic seizures. These mice also exhibit changes to the vestibular system within the ear, resulting in poor swimming skills, difficulty in walking on grid floors, and are found to run in circles erratically.

Angelman syndrome 
Deletion of the GABRB3 gene results in Angelman syndrome in humans, depending on the parental origin of the deletion. Deletion of the paternal allele of GABRB3  has no known implications with this syndrome, while deletion of the maternal GABRB3 allele results in development of the syndrome.

Nonsyndromic Orofacial Clefting 
There is a strong association between GABRB3 expression levels and proper palate development. A disturbance in GABRB3 expression can be lined to the malformation of nonsyndromic cleft lip with or without cleft palate.  Cleft lip and palate have also been observed in children who have inverted duplications encompassing the GABRB3 locus. Knockout of the beta-3 subunit in mice results in clefting of the secondary palate. Normal facial characteristics can be restored through the insertion of a Gabrb3 transgene into the mouse genome, making the Gabrb3 gene primarily responsible for cleft palate formation.

Autism Spectrum Disorder 
Duplications of the Prader-Willi/Angelman syndrome region, also known as the imprinting region (15q11-13) that encompasses the GABRB3 gene are present in some patients diagnosed with Autism. These patients exhibit classic symptoms that are associated with the disorder. Duplications of the 15q11-13 region displayed in autistic patients are almost always of maternal origin (not paternal) and account for 1–2% of diagnosed autism disorder cases. This gene is also a candidate for autism because of the physiological response that benzodiazepine has on the GABA-A receptor, when used to treat seizures and anxiety disorders.

The Gabrb3 gene deficient mouse has been proposed as a model of autism spectrum disorder. These mice exhibit similar phenotypic symptoms such as non-selective attention, deficits in a variety of exploratory parameters, sociability, social novelty, nesting and lower rearing frequency as can be equated to characteristics found in patients diagnosed with autism spectrum disorder. When studying Gabrb3 deficient mice, significant hypoplasia of the cerebellar vermis was observed.

There is an unknown association between autism and the 155CA-2 locus, located within an intron in GABRB3.

Epilepsy/Childhood absence epilepsy 
Defects in GABA transmission has often been implicated in epilepsy within animal models and human syndromes. Patients that are diagnosed with Angelman syndrome and have a deletion of the GABRB3 gene exhibit absence seizures. Reduced expression of the beta-3 subunit is a potential contributor to childhood absence epilepsy.

See also 
 GABAA receptor
 Heritability of autism

References

Further reading

External links 
 
 

Ion channels
Causes of autism